Montemale di Cuneo is a comune (municipality) in the Province of Cuneo in the Italian region Piedmont, located about  southwest of Turin and about  northwest of Cuneo.

Montemale di Cuneo borders the following municipalities: Caraglio, Dronero, Monterosso Grana, and Valgrana.

References 

Cities and towns in Piedmont